Lidia Drăgănescu (née Butnărașu; born 24 October 1967) is a Romanian former handballer who played as a left back for the Romanian national team.

Achievements 
Liga Națională:
Winner (5): 1986, 1987, 1992, 1993, 1994
Silver Medalist: 1988, 1990, 1991
Cupa României:
Winner (4): 1986, 1989, 1993, 1994
European Champions Cup: 
Finalist: 1986
Semifinalist: 1987 
EHF Cup:
Winner (1): 1989
Semifinalist: 1993, 1998
DHB-Pokal:
Winner (1): 1997
Serie A1:
Winner (1): 2000

References
 

1967 births
Living people
People from  Bacău County
Romanian female handball players 
SCM Râmnicu Vâlcea (handball) players
Expatriate handball players
Romanian expatriate sportspeople in Germany
Romanian expatriate sportspeople in Italy
Handball players at the 2000 Summer Olympics
Olympic handball players of Romania